Marcel Ondráš (born 21 September 1985) is a Slovak footballer, who plays for SV St. Martin. He also played for MŠK Žilina in the Corgoň Liga. His previous club was MFK Dubnica.

References

External links
MŠK Žilina profile 

 

1985 births
Living people
Slovak footballers
Slovak Super Liga players
Association football defenders
FK Dubnica players
MŠK Novohrad Lučenec players
MŠK Žilina players
FC ViOn Zlaté Moravce players
Polonia Bytom players
Expatriate footballers in Poland
Sportspeople from Trenčín